Muthuraja or Mutharaiyar  is a Tamil speaking landowning community prevalent in southern India.

Etymology 
The etymology of the community name is unclear. The names Muthuraja and Muthuraiyar may be derived from two words, the Tamil name muthu meaning "pearl" and raja or raiyar both meaning "king". Muttaraiyar may also be derived from mundru meaning "three" and tharai meaning "earth". 

Their title Ambalakkarar is derived from the Tamil word ambalam meaning panchayat or "village council", as they served as the heads of these councils.

History
The origin of the Muthuraja people is shrouded in mystery. Historian T. A. Gopinatha Rao equates them with the Kalabhras as Suvaran Maaran, a prominent 8th century Muthuraja king of Thanjavur is styled KalavaraKalvan in one of his inscriptions. Few historians like Rao read the epithet it as KalabhraKalvan interchanging the letter v with b. According to Tamil historians, the Mutharayar are said to have invaded kingdoms in Tamilakkam (now part of Tamil Nadu) around the 2nd century CE from Erumainadu(bison country), which is identified with the area in and around modern Mysore in Karnataka. British record them as belonging to Telugu origin and migrated to Tamilnadu along with Vijayanagaram dynasty.

Demographics
The Tamil Speaking Muthuraja are densely distributed in the Tiruchirappalli, Pudukkottai, Thanjavur, Karur, Madurai, Dindigul, Perambalur and Sivagangai districts of Tamil Nadu.

The Telugu   speaking Muthuraja Naidu comparatively fewer in number are mostly distributed in the Chennai, Tiruvallur, Kanchipuram, Vellore, Tiruvannamalai, Viluppuram and Cuddalore  districts of northern Tamil Nadu.

See also
Mutharaiyan title
Perumbidugu Mutharaiyar
Ilango Mutharaiyar
Kannappa Nayanar
Thirumangai Alvar
Thenpandi Singam

References

Pudukkottai state
Social groups of Tamil Nadu